Eumetabolodon is an extinct genus of procolophonine procolophonid parareptile from early and middle Triassic (Induan to earliest Anisian stages) deposits of Nei Mongol, northern China. Two species of Eumetabolodon were named by J. L. Li in 1983 and the type species is Eumetabolodon bathycephalus.

Discovery
The type species is known from the holotype IVPP V6064, a nearly complete skull which was collected in the Zhuengeerqi locality, from the upper Heshanggou Formation (Olenekian and earliest Anisian stages), Ordos Basin. A second specimen, IVPP V6070 was collected in the Zhuengeerqi locality, from the Ermaying Formation (upper Olenekian stage), Ordos Basin. Additional 17 specimens, IVPP V6065-69, V6166 (1&2), V6167, V6168 (1&2), V6169-75, were collected in the Gucheng locality, from the upper Heshanggou Formation, Ordos Basin. "E." dongshengensis is known only from the holotype IVPP V6073, a partial skull including right frontal, prefrontal, lacrimal, maxilla with seven teeth and the right ramus of lower jaw. It was collected in the Wusilangou locality near Dongsheng (also in Nei Mongol), from the Early Triassic Shihtienfeng Formation.

Phylogeny
Recent cladistic analyses suggested that Eumetabolodon is a paraphyletic genus; the type species represents a relatively derived procolophonine, whereas "E." dongshengensis is a more basal procolophonid of the subfamily Theledectinae. In 2020 a separate genus Youngetta was named.

The cladogram below follows the topology from a 2012 analysis by Cisneros.

References

Procolophonines
Early Triassic reptiles of Asia
Fossil taxa described in 1983
Middle Triassic reptiles of Asia
Anisian life
Prehistoric reptile genera